Osama El-Gendi (born 18 January 1953) is an officer in the Egyptian military. 

He graduated from the Naval Academy in Alexandria in 1973 in time to serve on a frigate as a fire direction officer during the Yom Kippur War and saw action outside the territorial waters near Damietta. On 14 August 2012, President Mohamed Morsi appointed him as the Commander of the Egyptian Navy after dismissing Vice Admiral Mohab Mamish. He is a member of the Supreme Council of the Armed Forces.

Military education

 Bachelor of the Navy studies
 The captain of the high seas, August's course
 Specific leadership course
 M.A. of military sciences and the navy studies, Egyptian Joint command college
 War staff course (Naval Specialization)
 Crisis Management / Negotiation course
 Advanced War Course - Nasser Military Academy
 Advanced Distinguished leaders Course  - Nasser Military Academy.
 M.A. of the global transport, The Arab academy for sciences and technology and the maritime transport.

Main commands

 Commander of Group in the Second Brigade Missile Frigates 1989-1993
 Commander of Second Brigade of Boats 1993-1997
 Chief of Operations of Red Sea Fleet 1997-2000
 Commander of Matrouh Naval Base 2000-2004
 Commander of Red Sea Fleet 2004-2008
 Commander-in-Chief of Alexandria Naval Base and Mediterranean Fleet 2008-2011
 Chief of Naval Operations 2011-2012
 Chief of staff  of the Egyptian Navy 2012-

Medals and decorations

 Medal of the 25th of April
 Medal of Military Duty, Second Class.
 Medal of Military Duty, First Class.
 Medal of Training, First Class
 Distinguished Service Decoration.
 Longevity and Exemplary Medal
 Medal of the Egyptian Navy.
 Silver Jubilee Medal of 6 October victory 25th Anniversary
 Golden Jubilee Medal of 23 July 50th Anniversary
 Silver Jubilee Medal of 25 April Anniversary
 January 25 Medal

References

1953 births
Living people
Egyptian Navy admirals
Egyptian people of the Yom Kippur War
20th-century Egyptian military personnel
Members of the Supreme Council of the Armed Forces